The Visit of the Royal Physician is a 1999 novel by the Swedish writer Per Olov Enquist. It is known as The Royal Physician's Visit in the United States, translated into English by Tiina Nunnally. Against the backdrop of political turbulence and the enlightenment in the second half of the 18th century, the narrative revolves around the court of the mentally ill King Christian VII of Denmark, and the romance between the king's physician, Johann Friedrich Struensee, and the queen, Caroline Mathilde. The novel won the August Prize and the Independent Foreign Fiction Prize.

Reception
John de Falbe of The Spectator wrote that "Enquist has imagined this appalling drama with immense sensitivity and intelligence." De Falbe continued: "Enquist writes in short, jerky sentences which often seem to repeat themselves. Although disconcerting at first, the technique works brilliantly. The atmosphere is suitably nervy, while the shifting ground beneath the apparent repetitions is vibrant with stealth and subterfuge. ... The swirling currents - emotional, political, social, spiritual - are so vivid that we cannot doubt the relevance of this historical tale." Bruce Bawer reviewed the book for The New York Times, and wrote that "Enquist's principal characters are realized with a vividness and subtlety that place the book in the front ranks of contemporary literary fiction", and called the prose "brisk, lucid, vigorous, penetrating, rich in arresting epigrams and marked by calculated repetitions that give the novel a touch of hypnotic power."

Adaptation 
The novel was adapted into an opera by Bo Holten, premiered in 2009.

See also
 1999 in literature
 Swedish literature
 A Royal Affair

References

Novels set in the 1760s
Novels set in the 1770s
1999 Swedish novels
Novels set in Denmark
Adultery in novels
Norstedts förlag books
August Prize-winning works
Swedish-language novels
Cultural depictions of Christian VII of Denmark
Cultural depictions of Caroline Matilda of Great Britain
Novels adapted into operas